The Battle of Mohács (or Mohaç Savaşı) was fought on 29 August 1526 near Mohács, Kingdom of Hungary, between the forces of the Kingdom of Hungary and its allies, led by Louis II, and those of the Ottoman Empire, led by Suleiman the Magnificent. The Ottoman victory led to the partition of Hungary for several centuries between the Ottoman Empire, the Habsburg monarchy, and the Principality of Transylvania. Further, the death of Louis II as he fled the battle marked the end of the Jagiellonian dynasty in Hungary and Bohemia, whose dynastic claims passed to the House of Habsburg.

Background

Decline of Hungarian royal power (1490–1526)
After the death of the absolutist King Matthias Corvinus in 1490, the Hungarian magnates, who did not want another heavy-handed king, procured the accession of the notoriously weak-willed King Vladislaus of Bohemia, who reigned as King Vladislaus II of Hungary from 1490 to 1516. He was known as King Dobře (or Dobzse in Hungarian orthography), meaning "all right", for his habit of accepting, without question, every petition and document laid before him. The freshly-elected King Vladislaus II donated most of the Hungarian royal estates, régales, and royalties to the nobility. Thus the king tried to stabilize his new reign and preserve his popularity among the magnates.

Given the naive fiscal and land policy of the royal court, the central power began to experience severe financial difficulties, largely due to the enlargement of feudal lands at royal expense. The noble estate of the parliament succeeded in reducing their tax burden by 70–80%, at the expense of the country's ability to defend itself. Vladislaus became the magnates' helpless "prisoner"; he could make no decision without their consent.

The standing mercenary army (the Black Army) of Matthias Corvinus was dissolved by the aristocracy. The magnates also dismantled the national administration systems and bureaucracy throughout the country. The country's defenses sagged as border-guards and castle garrisons went unpaid, fortresses fell into disrepair, and initiatives to increase taxes to reinforce defenses were stifled. Hungary's international role declined, its political stability shaken; social progress was deadlocked. The arrival of Protestantism further worsened internal relations in the country.

In 1514, the weakened and old King Vladislaus II faced a major peasant rebellion led by György Dózsa, which was ruthlessly crushed by the nobles, led by John Zápolya. After the Dózsa Rebellion, the brutal suppression of the peasants greatly aided the 1526 Turkish invasion as the Hungarians were no longer a politically united people. The resulting degradation of order paved the way for Ottoman pre-eminence.

Jagiellonian-Habsburg attempt to organize defence against the Ottomans
King Louis II of Hungary married Mary of Habsburg in 1522. The Ottomans saw this Jagiellonian-Habsburg marital alliance as a threat to their power in the Balkans and worked to break it. After Suleiman I came to power in Constantinople in 1520, the High Porte made the Hungarians at least one and possibly two offers of peace. For unclear reasons, Louis refused. It is possible that Louis was well aware of Hungary's situation (especially after the Ottomans defeated Persia in the Battle of Chaldiran (1514) and the Polish-Ottoman peace from 1525) and believed that war was a better option than peace. Even in peacetime, the Ottomans raided Hungarian lands and conquered small territories (with border castles), but a final battle still offered Louis a glimmer of hope. Accordingly, another Ottoman–Hungarian war ensued, and in June 1526 an Ottoman expedition advanced up the Danube.

In the early 1500s, Vladislav II (ruled 1490–1516), Louis II and Croatian nobles repeatedly asked Holy Roman Emperor Maximilian I for help, but during Maximilian's reign, assistance for Hungary remained a plan. After the first chain of fortresses fell however, assessing the threat to his own provinces, Archduke Ferdinand (later Holy Roman Emperor Ferdinand I) made a significant effort to help his brother-in-law. When Nándorfehérvár was being sieged, he summoned his estates and proposed sending troops to Hungary. In the end, 2,000 German infantry troops were sent. From 1522 to the 1526 defeat at Mohács, field troops from Austria frequently arrived but were not placed into fortresses at the border as regular garrisons yet. Even though this military aid purportedly strengthened this area of the border, it had the undesired effect of dissolving the unified leadership that the ban had held until that time.

Alfred Kohler opines that the coordination effort attempted by Ferdinand, Mary and Louis failed because the young Hungarian king showed a lack of vigour, which was also recognized by Hungarian nobles. Mary, on the other hand, was much more decisive and vigorous, but the non-Hungarian advisors she relied on created distrust.

European events, and the Franco-Ottoman alliance

In Europe, especially in Germany, negative trends have started to unfold. The Fuggers, who had taken control of the finances, "by around 1503 had a veritable monopoly of 'favoritism' in Germany, Hungary, Poland and Scandinavia, to the extent that any priest who wanted to get access to even the most modest parish had to turn to the merchants of Augsburg."

The Fugger family controlled the distribution of the Roman Catholic Church's indulgences, which, among other reasons, soon led to an international scandal and then to strong social unrest. After 1517, European public opinion became increasingly preoccupied and divided by the Reformation launched by Martin Luther. The religious upheaval was compounded by the German Peasants' War of 1524-1526, which mobilised considerable forces and, in addition to the material damage, caused more than 100,000 deaths.

Between 1521 and 1526, the Western European powers were preoccupied with the current episode of the Italian wars (which lasted from 1494 to 1559, with minor interruptions). France first sought allies in Eastern Europe against Holy Roman Emperor Charles V. French envoy Antonio Rincon visited Poland and Hungary several times between 1522 and 1525. After the Battle of Bicocca (1522), King Francis I of France tried - unsuccessfully - to ally himself with King Sigismund I of Poland. The Hungarian royal court also rejected the French offer, unlike János Szapolyai, the Voivode of Transylvania, who showed a willingness to cooperate with the French, although the formal treaty was not signed until 1528.

King Francis I of France was defeated at the Battle of Pavia on 24 February 1525 by the troops of the Habsburg Holy Roman Emperor, Charles V. After several months in prison, Francis I was forced to sign the Treaty of Madrid.

In a watershed moment in European diplomacy, Francis formed a formal Franco-Ottoman alliance with Sultan Suleiman the Magnificent as an ally against Charles V. The French-Ottoman strategic, and sometimes tactical, alliance lasted for about three centuries.

To relieve the Habsburg pressure on France, in 1525 Francis asked Suleiman to make war on the Holy Roman Empire, and the road from Turkey to the Holy Roman Empire led across Hungary. The request of the French king coincided well with the ambitions of Suleiman in Europe and gave him an incentive to attack Hungary in 1526, leading to the Battle of Mohács.

At the news of the war, the young King Louis II of Hungary appealed to the European princes for help, but only King Henry VIII of England offered aid (which arrived only in 1527 to Queen Mary of Hungary in Pozsony) and the Pope offered 50,000 gold pieces, while neither Charles V nor Ferdinand Habsburg (Archduke of Austria, the Hungarian king's brother-in-law) did anything. The fact is that the Habsburgs' armies were still on the battlefields of Italy.

Preparations

The Hungarians had long opposed Ottoman expansion in southeastern Europe, but in 1521 the Turks advanced up the Danube River and took Nándorfehérvár (present-day Belgrade, Serbia) – the strongest Hungarian fortress on the Danube – and Szabács (now Šabac, Serbia). This left most of southern Hungary indefensible.

The loss of Nándorfehérvár caused great alarm in Hungary, but the huge 60,000 strong royal army – led by the king, but recruited too late and too slowly – neglected to take food along.  Therefore, the army disbanded spontaneously under pressure from hunger and disease without even trying to recapture Belgrade from the newly installed Turkish garrisons. In 1523, Archbishop Pál Tomori, a valiant priest-soldier, was made Captain of Southern Hungary. The general apathy that had characterized the country forced him to lean on his own bishopric revenues when he started to repair and reinforce the second line of Hungary's border defense system. Pétervárad fell to the Turks on July 15, 1526, due to the chronic lack of castle garrisons. The Danube river was an extremely important transport route for the Ottoman army in the region, so it was clear to everyone that the Ottoman army would follow the line of the Danube. For about  along the Danube between Pétervárad and Buda there was no single Hungarian town, village, or fortification of any sort.

Three years later, an Ottoman army set out from Constantinople on 16 April 1526, led by Suleiman the Magnificent personally. The Hungarian nobles, who still did not realize the magnitude of the approaching danger, did not immediately heed their King's call for troops. Eventually, the Hungarians assembled in three main units: the Transylvanian army under John Zápolya, charged with guarding the passes in the Transylvanian Alps, with between 8,000 and 13,000 men; the main army, led by Louis himself (beside numerous Spanish, German, Czech, and Serbian mercenaries); and another smaller force, commanded by the Croatian count Christoph Frankopan, numbering around 5,000 men. The Ottomans deployed the largest field artillery of the era, comprising some 300 cannons, while the Hungarians had only 85 cannons, though even this number was greater than other contemporary Western European armies deployed on the battlefields during the major conflicts of Western European powers.

The number of regular professional paid soldiers (Kapıkulu) employed by the High Porte throughout the Ottoman Empire did not exceed 15,000–16,000 men in the first third of the 16th century. During this time Suleiman could raise an army between 50,000–60,000 for campaigns.

The Ottomans obtained most of the arquebuses for their janissary army from Hungarian and Venetian gunsmiths. This phenomenon was so widespread and severe, that in 1525 the Hungarian Parliament had to pass a law against the export of Hungarian-made arquebuses for the Ottoman Empire.

Contrary to popular belief, the Hungarian infantry was so well equipped with arquebuses that, it had an unusually high firepower in a comparison with contemporary Western European standards. Both armies faced a tactical challenge, namely that they could not move their firepower very well. As a result, they were only able to use them effectively if they fired from a defensive position.
The question was who could force the other to start the attack on the battlefield, that is, to attack positions that could then be defended with cannons and arquebuses.

The division of the Hungarian army according to arms based on our current knowledge is, without claiming completeness: 3,000 armoured knights from the Hungarian noble banderiums, the king's bodyguard (1,000 armoured knights), 4,500 light cavalry (mainly hussars of Serbian origin), 6,700 mainly Hungarian infantry, 5,300 Papal infantry (mainly German , but Italian and Spanish contingents were also represented in smaller numbers) and 1,500 Polish infantry, with an unknown number of artillerymen. As for the rest of the army, we do not have sufficient data and accurate knowledge for a full reconstruction at present.

The geography of the area meant that the Hungarians could not know the Ottomans' ultimate goal until the latter crossed the Balkan Mountains, and when they did, the Transylvanian and Croatian forces were farther from Buda than the Ottomans were. Contemporary historical records, though sparse, indicate that Louis preferred a plan of retreat, in effect ceding the country to Ottoman advances, rather than directly engaging the Ottoman army in open battle. The Hungarian war council – without waiting for reinforcements from Croatia and Transylvania only a few days march away – made a serious tactical error by choosing the battlefield near Mohács, an open but uneven plain with some swampy marshes.

Fichtner writes that before the Battle of Mohács, there was a breakdown of communication between Louis and his brother-in-law, Archduke Ferdinand. Ferdinand was unaware of the urgency of the situation. To make the matter worse, Louis and the Hungarian court failed to inform him that they had decided to fight a decisive battle on the plain of Mohács (this decision was made on 26 August, one day before Ferdinand's departure: in a conference in Louis's camp in Bata, the chancellor Stephen Brodarics advised the king to wait for  reinforcements from Austria and Bohemia, but a group of impetuous nobles managed to persuade the king to engage in an open, immediate battle on the plains of Mohacs against the numerically superior Ottomans). Ferdinand, facing religious tensions and uprisings in his own lands as well as his brothers' requests for more troops for other theaters, decided to tend to what he thought to be more urgent affairs first. According to Stephen Fischer-Galati, that literature shows that Louis himself seemed to be unable to fully understand the seriousness or immediacy of the Turkish threat. It was possible that Louis based his confidence on the assurances of John Zapolya and his supporters, who promised to come to help. Magnates who feared Habsburg interference desired a total Hungarian effort to either contain (militarily or diplomatically) or reach a truce with the Porte.

The Ottomans had advanced toward Mohács almost unopposed. While Louis waited in Buda, they had besieged several towns (Petervarad, Ujlak, and Eszek), and crossed the Sava and Drava Rivers. At Mohács the Hungarians numbered some 25,000 to 30,000 soldiers. The only external help was a small contingent of Polish troops (1,500 soldiers and knights) led by the royal captain Lenart Gnoiński (but organized and equipped by the Papal State). The Ottoman army numbered perhaps 50,000, though some contemporary and modern-day historians put the number of the Ottoman troops at 100,000. Most of the Ottoman Balkan forces registered before this battle were described as Bosnians or Croats.

The Hungarian army was arrayed to take advantage of the terrain and hoped to engage the Ottoman army piecemeal. They had the advantage that their troops were well-rested, while the Turks had just completed a strenuous march in scorching summer heat.

Battle

The Hungarian deployment for battle consisted of two lines.
The first had a center of mercenary infantry and artillery and the majority of the cavalry on either flank. The second was a mix of levy infantry and cavalry. The Ottoman army was a more modern force built around artillery and the elite, musket-armed Janissaries. The remainder consisted of feudal Timarli cavalry and conscripted levies from Rumelia and the Balkans.

As the first of Suleiman's troops, the Rumelian army, advanced onto the battlefield, they were attacked and routed by Hungarian troops led by Pál Tomori. This attack by the Hungarian right caused considerable chaos among the irregular Ottoman troops, but even as the Hungarian attack pressed forward, the Ottomans rallied with the arrival of Ottoman regulars deployed from the reserves. While the Hungarian right advanced far enough at one time to place Suleiman in danger from Hungarian bullets that struck his cuirass, the superiority of the Ottoman regulars and the timely charge of the Janissaries, overwhelmed the attackers, particularly on the Hungarian left. The Hungarians took serious casualties from the skillfully handled Turkish artillery and musket volleys. The Hungarians could not hold their positions, and those who did not flee were surrounded and killed or captured. The result was catastrophic for the Hungarians, with their lines advancing into withering fire and flank attacks, and falling into the same trap that John Hunyadi had so often used successfully against the Ottomans. The king left the battlefield sometime around twilight but was thrown from his horse in a river at Csele and drowned, weighed down by his heavy armor. Some 1,000 other Hungarian nobles and leaders were also killed. It is generally accepted that more than 14,000 Hungarian soldiers were killed in the initial battle.

Suleiman could not believe that this small, suicidal army was all that the once powerful country could muster against him, so he waited at Mohacs for a few days before moving cautiously against Buda. On 31 August, 2,000 Hungarian prisoners were massacred as the Sultan watched from a golden throne.

Aftermath

The victory did not give the Ottomans the security they wanted. Buda was left undefended; only the French and Venetian ambassadors waited for the Sultan to congratulate him on his great victory. Though they entered the unguarded evacuated Buda and pillaged the castle and surroundings, they retreated soon afterwards. It was not until 1541 that the Ottomans finally captured and occupied Buda following the 1541 Siege of Buda. However, for all intents and purposes, the Battle of Mohács meant the end of the independent Kingdom of Hungary as a unified entity.  Amid political chaos, the divided Hungarian nobility elected two kings simultaneously, John Zápolya in 1526 and Ferdinand of Austria in 1527. The Ottoman occupation was contested by the Habsburg Archduke of Austria, Ferdinand I, Louis's brother-in-law and successor by treaty with King Vladislaus II.

Bohemia fell to the Habsburgs, who also dominated the northern and western parts of Hungary and the remnants of the Kingdom of Croatia, while the Ottomans held central Hungary and suzerainty over semi-independent Transylvania. This provided the Hungarians with sufficient impetus to continue to resist the Ottoman occupation, which they did for another seventy years.

The Austrian branch of Habsburg monarchs needed the economic power of Hungary for the Ottoman wars. During the Ottoman wars the territory of the former Kingdom of Hungary shrunk by around 70%. Despite these territorial and demographic losses, the smaller, heavily war-torn Royal Hungary had remained economically more important than Austria or the Kingdom of Bohemia even at the end of the 16th century. Of Ferdinand's territories, the depleted Kingdom of Hungary was at that time his largest source of revenue.

The subsequent near constant warfare required a sustained commitment of Ottoman forces, proving a drain on resources that the largely rural and war-torn kingdom proved unable to repay. Crusader armies besieged Buda several times during the 16th century. Sultan Suleiman himself died of natural causes in Hungary during the Battle of Szigetvár in 1566. There were also two unsuccessful Ottoman sieges of Eger, which did not fall until 1596, seventy years after the Ottoman victory at Mohács. The Turks proved unable to conquer the northern and western parts of Hungary, which belonged to the Habsburg monarchs.

A book on the Turkish culture was written by Georgius Bartholomaeus with information obtained from Christian troops released by the Ottomans after the battle.

Legacy

Mohács is seen by many Hungarians as the decisive downward turning point in the country's history, a national trauma that persists in the nation's folk memory. To indicate magnitude of bad luck at hand, Hungarians still say: "more was lost at Mohács". Hungarians view Mohács as marking the end of Hungary as an independent and powerful European nation.

Whilst Mohács was a decisive loss, it was the aftermath that truly put an end to fully independent Hungary. The ensuing two hundred years of near constant warfare between the two empires, Habsburg and Ottoman, turned Hungary into a perpetual battlefield and its territories were split into three parts. The countryside was regularly ravaged by armies moving back and forth, in turn devastating the population. Only in the 19th century would Hungary reestablish its former boundaries; with full independence from Habsburg rule coming only after the First World War. 
The battlefield, beside the village of Sátorhely, became an official national historical memorial site in 1976 on the 450th anniversary of the battle. The memorial was designed by architect György Vadász. A new reception hall and exhibition building, also designed by Vadász and partially funded by the European Union, was completed in 2011.

The year of battle of Mohács marks the end of Middle Ages in the Central European historiography.

See also

The Ottomans: Europe's Muslim Emperors

Notes

References and further reading 
 Brodarics, Istvan[Stephanus Brodericus 1480–1539]: De conflictu Hungarorum cum Turcis ad Mohacz verissima historia. 1527, Krakow [It was originally a written report for the Polish king Sigismund I.] http://real-r.mtak.hu/1472/
 Király, Béla K., and Gunther Erich Rothenberg. War and Society in East Central Europe: The fall of medieval kingdom of Hungary: Mohacs 1526 – Buda 1541 (Brooklyn College Press, 1989).
 Minahan, James B. One Europe, many nations: a historical dictionary of European national groups, (Greenwood Press, 2000).
 Molnár, Miklós, A Concise History of Hungary (Cambridge UP, 2001).
 Nicolle, David, Hungary and the fall of Eastern Europe, 1000–1568 (Osprey, 1988).
 Palffy, Geza. The Kingdom of Hungary and the Habsburg Monarchy in the Sixteenth Century (East European Monographs, distributed by Columbia University Press, 2010) 406 pages; Covers the period after the battle of Mohacs in 1526 when the Kingdom of Hungary was partitioned in three, with one segment going to the Habsburgs.
 Pálosfalvi, Tamás. From Nicopolis to Mohács: A History of Ottoman-Hungarian Warfare, 1389–1526 (Brill, 2018) 
 Rady, Martyn. "Rethinking Jagiełło Hungary (1490–1526)." Central Europe 3.1 (2005): 3–18. online
 Stavrianos, L.S. Balkans Since 1453 (C. Hurst & Co. Publishers, 2000).
 Szabó, János B. "The Ottoman Conquest in Hungary: Decisive Events (Belgrade 1521, Mohács 1526, Vienna 1529, Buda 1541) and Results." in The Battle for Central Europe (Brill, 2019) pp. 263–275.
I. Szulejmán [hadi] naplói. (az 1521, 1526, 1529, 1532-ik év).[Selection of war diaries of Suleiman sultan translated from Turiksh to Hungarian] 277–363 p. In: Thúry József: Török-Magyarkori Történelmi emlekek I.Török történetírók. Budapest, 1893, Magyar Tudományos Akadémia. 434 p. https://archive.org/details/trktrtne01thuruoft
 Turnbull, Stephen. The Ottoman Empire 1326–1699 (Osprey, 2003).
Verancsics, Antal [1507–1573]: Memoria rerum que in Hungária nato rege Ludovico ultimo acciderunt, qui fuit ultimi Ladislai filius.  Összes munkái között [among all of his works]: Monumenta Hungáriáé Historica Scriptores III.  Közli: Szalay László. Pest. 1857
 History Foundation, Improvement of Balkan History Textbooks Project Reports (2001)

External links

 The Fall of The Medieval Kingdom of Hungary: Mohacs 1526 – Buda 1541 (archived 21 April 2007)
 War diary of Suleiman in 1526

Mohacs 1526
Mohacs 1526
Mohacs 1526
Mohacs 1526
Mohacs 1526
16th century in Hungary
Mohacs 1526
Mohacs 1526
Conflicts in 1526
Massacres in Hungary
Ottoman period in Hungary
Mohacs 1526
Suleiman the Magnificent
1526 in the Ottoman Empire
Massacres committed by the Ottoman Empire